Peter Nagy (17 December 1964 – 3 December 2021) was a Slovak slalom canoeist who competed at the international level from 1990 to 2001.

He was born in Bratislava, Czechoslovakia. He won a bronze medal for Czechoslovakia in the K1 team event at the 1991 ICF Canoe Slalom World Championships in Tacen.

Nagy competed in two Summer Olympics for Slovakia, earning his best finish of 12th in the K1 event in Sydney in 2000. He died in Bratislava.

References

External links
 

1964 births
2021 deaths
Canoeists at the 1996 Summer Olympics
Canoeists at the 2000 Summer Olympics
Czechoslovak male canoeists
Olympic canoeists of Slovakia
Slovak male canoeists
Medalists at the ICF Canoe Slalom World Championships
Sportspeople from Bratislava